TAJ NEWS is a Hindi-language 24/7 News television channel, owned by TAJ TV Group. The channel is free-to-air, and is available across all major cable and DTH platforms as well as online.

References

Hindi-language television channels in India
Television channels and stations established in 2015
Hindi-language television stations
Television channels based in Noida
2015 establishments in Uttar Pradesh